Richard Crooker (born 9 April 1948) is a Canadian rower. He competed in the men's coxed eight event at the 1968 Summer Olympics.

References

1948 births
Living people
Canadian male rowers
Olympic rowers of Canada
Rowers at the 1968 Summer Olympics
Sportspeople from Ontario